The Rule Water is a river in the Scottish Borders area of Scotland, and a tributary of the River Teviot.
The Rule Water rises in Wauchope Forest and passes Hobkirk, Bonchester Bridge, Hallrule, Abbotrule, and Bedrule until it joins the River Teviot at Spittal-on-Rule.

Other placenames include the name of the Rule Water, e.g. Ruletownhead.

History
The English commander Lord Hertford sent John Musgrove and George Heron along the Rule Water in November 1542 and they burnt places called Rule and Abbot's Rule. During the war now known as the Rough Wooing, Hertford reported that on 16 September 1545, "I sent forth a good band to the number of 1500 light horsemen in the leading of me [and] Sir Robert Bowes, which from 5 a.m. till 3 p.m., forayed along the waters of Tyvyote and Rowle, 6 or 7 miles beyond Jedburgh, and burnt 14 or 15 towns and a great quantity of all kinds of corn". A list of twelve places on the Rule Water burnt during the raid comprises "Rowle, Spittel, Bedrowle (Bedrule Castle), Rowlewood, The Wolles, Crossebewghe, Donnerles, Fotton (Fulton Tower), West Leas, Two walk mylnes (two fulling mills), Troonyhill, Dupligis".

In the 19th century a toll road was constructed from Carter Bar to the market town on Hawick necessitating the building of the Bonchester Bridge over Rule Water.

A history of the Rule Water entitled "Rulewater and its People; An account of the Valley of the Rule and its Inhabitants" by George Tancred was published in 1907.

See also
List of rivers of Scotland
List of places in the Scottish Borders
List of places in Scotland

References

Gallery

External links
Gazetteer for Scotland: Rule Water
RCAHMS record of Rule Water
RCAHMS/Canmore record of Spital-on-Rule Bridge

Rivers of the Scottish Borders
2Rule